Baimovo (Bayım) is a rural locality (a village) in Nigamatovsky Selsoviet, Baymaksky District, Bashkortostan, Russia. The population was 487 as of 2010. There are 3 streets.

Geography 
Baimovo is located 42 km northwest of Baymak (the district's administrative centre) by road. 2-ye Itkulovo is the nearest rural locality.

References 

Rural localities in Baymaksky District